Alien Nation comic books were a number of comic books based on the Alien Nation entertainment media franchise. DC Comics initially produced a single-issue comic book adaptation of the 1988 film. Later, Malibu Comics, under their Adventure Comics imprint, produced several spin-off titles between 1990 and 1992.

Publications

See also
List of comics based on films

References

External links
Welcome Back to the Planet of the Apes, Comics Scene #13 (1990) about the Adventure Comics run on PotA, including Ape Nation

Comic book
DC Comics titles
Malibu Comics titles
Adventure Publications titles
Comics based on films
Comics about extraterrestrial life